Florence Bosire (born 26 September 1988) is a retired Kenyan female volleyball player. She was part of the Kenya women's national volleyball team.

She participated in the 2010 FIVB Volleyball Women's World Championship, and in the 2011 FIVB Volleyball Women's Club World Championship.
She played with Kenya Prisons.

Clubs
  Kenya Prisons (2010)

References

1988 births
Living people
Kenyan women's volleyball players